React Native is an open-source UI software framework created by Meta Platforms, Inc. It is used to develop applications for Android, Android TV, iOS, macOS, tvOS, Web, Windows and UWP by enabling developers to use the React framework along with native platform capabilities. It is also being used to develop virtual reality applications at Oculus.

History

In 2012 Mark Zuckerberg commented, "The biggest mistake we made as a company was betting too much on HTML as opposed to native". Using HTML5 for Facebook's mobile version resulted in an unstable application that retrieved data slowly. He promised Facebook would soon deliver a better mobile experience.

Inside Facebook, Jordan Walke found a way to generate UI elements for iOS from a background JavaScript thread, which became the basis for the React web framework. They decided to organize an internal Hackathon to perfect this prototype in order to be able to build native apps with this technology.

In 2015, after months of development, Facebook released the first version for the React JavaScript Configuration. During a technical talk, Christopher Chedeau explained that Facebook was already using React Native in production for their Group App and their Ads Manager App.

Implementation

The working principles of React Native are virtually identical to React except that React Native does not manipulate the DOM via the Virtual DOM. It runs in a background process (which interprets the JavaScript written by the developers) directly on the end-device and communicates with the native platform via serialized data over an asynchronous and batched bridge.

React components wrap existing native code and interact with native APIs via React's declarative UI paradigm and JavaScript.

While React Native styling has a similar syntax to CSS, it does not use HTML or CSS. Instead, messages from the JavaScript thread are used to manipulate native views. Without React Native, developers have to write native code in the languages of the aimed platform such as Java or Kotlin for Android, Objective-C or Swift for iOS, and C++/WinRT or C# for Windows 10.

React Native is also available for both Windows and macOS, which is currently maintained by Microsoft.

Hello World example

A Hello, World program in React Native looks like this:

import { AppRegistry, Text } from 'react-native';
import * as React from 'react';

const HelloWorldApp = => {
  return <Text>Hello world!</Text>;
}

export default HelloWorldApp;

AppRegistry.registerComponent('HelloWorld', => HelloWorldApp);

See also
 React (JavaScript library)
 Multiple phone web-based application framework
 NativeScript
 Xamarin
 Titanium SDK
 Apache Cordova
 Flutter (software)
 Qt (software)
Codename One

References

Mobile software development
Software using the MIT license
Facebook software
Software development
Cross-platform software